Griselinia lucida, commonly known as puka, akapuka or shining broadleaf, is an epiphytic plant native to New Zealand. G. lucida naturally occurs in wet lowland-forests and open or rocky coastal environments mostly in the North Island of New Zealand, and restricted areas of the South Island.

Griselinia lucida has large, asymmetrical, shiny, dark-green leaves. It has distinctive fluted roots that descend down from the host trees the plant is growing in.

Description
In general, this tree can grow up to 10–15 metres tall. It has rough and short branches which can stretch to 15 decimetres in diameter. The shape of apical leaf is broad-ovate to ovate-oblong or rounded with smooth margin.  The yellow-green leaves are thick and glossy and their width can be 5-12 cm long by 4-5cm wide; one edge is usually a little longer than the other edge at the base - one of the typical characteristics. They are arranged on the stem in the alternate pattern. The greenish flowers are quite small and are borne on slim twigs from late spring to mid-summer. The panicles of flowers are small, too. Five petals are owned by the pistillate flowers. The dark purple or black berries can be 6-7 mm long and appear in mid-summer, ripening from autumn to winter.

Distribution 
Throughout the North Island, and in the South Island to North Canterbury in the east and South Westland. It can be found everywhere from lowland to high hills or forest or shrub land.  It is more common in the South Island than the North Island.  In the North Island, it grows at higher altitudes than in the South Island.

Habitat preferences 
This plant can grow in a range of environments. In moist climates this plant can be an epiphyte with roots extending to the ground to absorb water and nutrients.  The plant is often grown as a screen or hedging to resist wind or other extreme situations.

Life cycle/phenology
There are three  phases in the forest growth cycle: the gap phase, the building phase and the mature phase.  The gap phase is the period when canopy openings  are receptive to colonisation; the building phase is the period when the seedling attains canopy status; and the mature phase is the period when the canopy remains intact.  Broadleaf grow faster in the building phase than the other phases. Diameter growth rates are generally faster during the gap and building phases (0.31cm per year) – when the leaves become bigger and bigger to absorb the sunlight for photosynthesis – than during the mature phase (just 0.19cm per year).
The average height increment of Broadleaf and other major canopy species is 15 cm per year (range 10-18 cm).
The flowers are borne on slim twigs and are very small (4–6 mm in diameter). The female flowers lack petals, but the male flowers have small greenish petals and are 5 mm in diameter. They appear from late spring to mid-summer.  The flowers are unisexual, with male and female flowers growing on separate trees. Pollen is transferred from one flower to another flower by wind and insects. 
Fruits stay green until near maturity, when they darken to purple or black before falling to the ground.  The berries are 6-7 mm long, appearing in mid-summer and ripening from autumn to winter.

References

Griseliniaceae
Trees of New Zealand
Trees of mild maritime climate